Shore Country Day School is an independent elementary and middle school, founded in 1936 following the tenets of the Country Day School movement. The private school educates students in grade levels ranging from a Pre-Kindergarten program through to Grade 9. It is accredited by the Association of Independent Schools of New England (AISNE) with the most recent accreditation review in 2008. Enrollment averages 435 to 450 students annually.

The school is located on a 17 acre campus in Beverly, Massachusetts with athletic fields, two gyms, a library resource center, and five school buildings.

History 
At the heart of Shore's campus is the Winslow Building, which was originally the property of Sidney Winslow, a prominent industrialist associated with founding Beverly's historic United Shoe Machine Corporation. Winslow's mansion housed the former North Shore Country Day school which merged with the Shore School of Beverly Farms in 1936, to form Shore Country Day School. A historical mural was painted in the Library Media Resource Center in the Summer of 2011 which depicts the history of Beverly Massachusetts as it relates to Shore Country Day School. The artists, Joshua Winer and David Fichter, researched notable events in local history and integrated these into a large mural which features 12 prominent individuals.

The school was featured in North Shore magazine's list of the "Leading Private Schools" in the area in 2011/2012.

Facilities 
The school features an "Inspiration Garden" which was dedicated in 2010 and designed by Julie Moir Messervey.

Mascot 
Shore Country Day School has a beaver mascot, and the logo features the beaver under a tree.

Motto 
Suum Quisque Optimum From Each His/Her Best

References

External links 
 

Schools in Beverly, Massachusetts